The Divorce Reform Act 1969 is an Act of Parliament in the United Kingdom. The Act reformed the law on divorce by enabling couples to divorce after they had been separated for two years if they both desired a divorce, or five years if only one wanted a divorce. People could end marriages that had "irretrievably broken down" and neither partner had to prove "fault". It was approved on 22 October 1969 and became law when it received Royal Assent on 1 January 1971.

The law built on the Matrimonial Causes Act 1857, which allowed people to divorce without an Act of Parliament where there had been adultery and cruelty, rape, bestiality or incest, and the Matrimonial Causes Act 1937, which extended the eligible grounds for divorce to include cruelty, incurable insanity and desertion (of three years or more).

The Act was passed only after lengthy and complex processes of negotiation, including a Royal Commission, discussion and eventual backing for the "irretrievable breakdown concept" amongst a group convened by the Archbishop of Canterbury, consideration by the Law Commission, and debate in Parliament.

References 

Divorce law in the United Kingdom
United Kingdom Acts of Parliament 1969